James Magnus Watt (born May 11, 1950) is an American retired professional ice hockey goaltender.

Early life 
Watt was born in Duluth, Minnesota. He was a member of the Michigan State Spartans men's ice hockey team before turning professional.

Career 
Watt played one NHL game with the St. Louis Blues in 1974 but spent most of his time in the minor leagues. Watt also played for Team USA at the 1972 Ice Hockey World Championship tournament.

Awards and honors

See also
List of players who played only one game in the NHL

References

External links

1950 births
Living people
AHCA Division I men's ice hockey All-Americans
American men's ice hockey goaltenders
Ice hockey people from Duluth, Minnesota
St. Louis Blues players
Tidewater Sharks players
Undrafted National Hockey League players
Winston-Salem Polar Twins (SHL) players

Michigan State Spartans men's ice hockey players
People from Duluth, Minnesota